Seliran or Saliran may refer to:
 Seliran-e Olya
 Seliran-e Sofla